Begum Om Habibeh Aga Khan (15 February 1906 – 1 July 2000) was the fourth and last wife of Sir Sultan Muhammad Shah, Aga Khan III. The couple married thirteen months after the Aga Khan III and his third wife were divorced by mutual consent. The Begum was well known for her generosity towards and compassion for the impoverished and the elderly. 

Her Egypt-based Om Habibeh Foundation worked towards the alleviation of poverty and the improvement of quality of life in the area surrounding Aswan, Egypt, and in Le Cannet she established a retirement home.  She was particularly interested in women's issues and, an accomplished artist and sculptor, she was also interested in the arts including classical music, ballet, and the opera. The Begum died at the age of 94 in Le Cannet and was buried in the mausoleum of her husband at Aswan.

Biography

Early life
She was born Yvonne Blanche Labrousse in the town of Sète, France on 15 February 1906. She was called Yvette. She was the daughter of Adrien Labrousse, a tramway conductor, and Marie Brouet, a seamstress. Her family soon moved to Cannes and later on to Lyon where the young Yvette spent most of her childhood. In 1929, at the age of twenty-four, she became Miss Lyon and one year later she was named Miss France. As a beauty queen and a representative of France, she traveled to many countries around the world. She found herself particularly taken by Egypt and, in the late 1930s, she moved to Cairo and adopted the faith of Islam.

Married life
Yvette Labrousse met Aga Khan III in Egypt and they married on 9 October 1944 in Switzerland. The new Begum assumed the name of Om Habibeh after one of the Prophet Muhammad's wives. Her husband playfully nicknamed her "Yaky", which was composed from the initials of "Yvette", "Aga" and "Khan". The Begum designed their villa at Le Cannet near Cannes and it was named "Yakymour", combining her nickname "Yaky" and "Amour", the French word for love.

In 1954, Om Habibeh was given the title of Mata Salamat, which literally means serene or peaceful mother. Of his marriage to Begum Om Habibeh, the Aga Khan III wrote in his memoirs, "I can only say that if a perfectly happy marriage be one in which there is a genuine and complete union and understanding, on the spiritual, mental, and emotional planes, ours is such." Shortly before his death, the Aga Khan III chose a location on the West Bank of the Nile as his final resting place. 

The location was highly symbolic, for centuries earlier the Aga Khan's ancestors had founded the Fatimid dynasty with its capital in Cairo. The Fatimids represented one of the apogees of Muslim culture, being patrons of the arts, architecture, literature, pluralism and scientific endeavors, all fields that were equally dear to the Aga Khan III and Om Habibeh. Immediately after her husband's death, she oversaw the building of a mausoleum, a task that took 16 months and the help of architect Farid El-Shafie and contractor Hassan Dorra.

Later life
When the Aga Khan III appointed his grandson, Karim, to succeed him to the title of Aga Khan IV, he also indicated in his will that he desired Begum Om Habibeh to offer her wise counsel during the first seven years of the Imamat of Karim Aga Khan IV. The Aga Khan III stated in his will that the Begum had been familiar for many years with the issues facing his followers and he had confidence in her wise judgment. After the death of her husband, the Begum predominantly lived in Aswan and Le Cannet, but also stayed in Geneva and Paris. She died at the age of 94 in Le Cannet on 1 July 2000.

Om Habibeh Foundation
In 1991, the Begum established the Om Habibeh Foundation, a not-for-profit organization that has contributed to health and educational facilities in Aswan. A kidney dialysis centre at the local hospital was set up by the foundation, as were several schools in the area.  In Le Cannet, she established a retirement home and in 1999, the Mayor of Le Cannet Rocheville unveiled a bronze statue in her honor in the Jardin des Oliviers.

Legacy of the 'Red Rose'
Begum Om Habibeh is often remembered as the 'Red Rose' due to her daily ritual of placing a red rose upon the tomb of her husband during the time she spent in Egypt. When she was away, she arranged for the ritual to be carried out by the gardener.  Her relationship with the Aga Khan III is widely remembered as a great love story and has been called a legendary and storybook romance.

Honours

Iranian honours 
  Member of the Order of the Pleiades, 1st Class.
  25th Centennial Anniversary Medal (14 October 1971).

References

1906 births
2000 deaths
People from Sète
French Ismailis
Habibeh, Om
Miss France winners
Converts to Shia Islam
Wives of knights
Noorani family
20th-century philanthropists